James Ellis Humphrey (1861-1897) was an American botanist and mycologist. He made notable contributions on Saprolegniaceae.  He graduated from Harvard University.

References

External links
 

American botanists
1861 births
1897 deaths
Harvard University alumni